1-Amino-3-phenylindole is a chemical compound.  A derivative of this substance is the antidepressant binedaline.

References 

Indoles